The 2018 World Junior Ice Hockey Championship Division III was played with one group of six teams, as well as a three team qualification tournament for the 2019 tournament. Israel won all their games and were promoted to Division II B. The team which placed first in the qualification tournament was expected to be promoted to Division III, swapping places with the sixth place team in Division III, but the 2019 organizers chose to make Division III a single tournament making these placings irrelevant.

The tournament was a round-robin tournament format, with two points allotted for a win, one additional point for a regulation win, and one point for an overtime or game winning shots loss.

To be eligible as a junior player in these tournaments, a player could not be born earlier than 1998.

The main Division III tournament was held in Sofia, Bulgaria, while the qualification was hosted in Cape Town, South Africa. The qualification was supposed to have the debut of the Turkmenistan national junior team, though they dropped out prior to it starting.

Division III

The Division III tournament was played in Sofia, Bulgaria, from 22 to 28 January 2018.

Participants

Final standings

Results
All times are local (UTC+2).

Statistics

Top 10 scorers

GP = Games played; G = Goals; A = Assists; Pts = Points; +/− = Plus-minus; PIM = Penalties In Minutes
Source: IIHF

Goaltending leaders
(minimum 40% team's total ice time)

TOI = Time on ice (minutes:seconds); GA = Goals against; GAA = Goals against average; Sv% = Save percentage; SO = Shutouts
Source: IIHF

Awards
Best Players Selected by the Directorate
 Goaltender:  Maksymillian Mojzyszek
 Defenceman:  Konstantin Dikov
 Forward:  Mark Revniaga

Division III Qualification
The Division III Qualification tournament was played in Cape Town, South Africa, from 5 to 7 February 2018.

Participants

The tournament originally included Turkmenistan, but they withdrew before the event began.

Standings

Results
All times are local (UTC+2).

External links
IIHF.com

III
World Junior Ice Hockey Championships – Division III
International ice hockey competitions hosted by Bulgaria
International ice hockey competitions hosted by South Africa
2018 in Bulgarian sport
2018 in South African sport
Sports competitions in Sofia
Sports competitions in Cape Town
IIHF
IIHF